Isidore the Labourer, also known as Isidore the Farmer (c. 1070 – 15 May 1130), was a Spanish farmworker known for his piety toward the poor and animals. He is the Catholic patron saint of farmers, and of Madrid, El Gobernador, Jalisco and of La Ceiba, Honduras. His feast day is celebrated on 15 May.

The Spanish profession name labrador comes from the verb labrar ("to till", "to plow" or, in a broader sense, "to work the land"). Hence, to refer to him as simply a "laborer" is a poor translation of the Spanish labrador as it makes no reference to the essential farming aspect of his work and his identity.  His real name was Isidro de Merlo y Quintana.

Biography
Isidore was born in Madrid, in about the year 1070 or 1082, of poor but very devout parents, and was christened Isidore from the name of their patron, St. Isidore of Seville.
In 1083 or 1085, the troops of Alfonso VI of León and Castile conquered Madrid from the Muslim taifa of Toledo.
Isidore spent his life as a hired hand in the service of the wealthy Madrilenian landowner Juan de Vargas on a farm in the city's vicinity. He shared what he had, even his meals, with the poor. Juan de Vargas would later make him bailiff of his entire estate of Lower Caramanca.

Isidore and Maria had one son. On one occasion, their son fell into a deep well and, at the prayers of his parents, the water of the well is said to have risen miraculously to the level of the ground, bringing the child with it. In thanksgiving Isidore and Maria then vowed sexual abstinence and lived in separate houses. Their son later died in his youth.

Isidore died on 15 May 1130, at his birthplace close to Madrid, although the only official source places his death in the year 1172.

In 2022, a team from the Complutense University undertook a forensic study of the corpse.
A coin with a lion was found in the throat.
It was conjectured that it could date from the age of Henry IV of Castile.
The only active illness found was dental abscesses.
The researchers proposed them as cause of death.
The age of death ranges between 35 and 45 years.
The height was estimated between 167 and 186 cm.
The cranium shows a predominance of African features.

Miracle stories

In the morning before going to work, Isidore would usually attend Mass at one of the churches in Madrid. One day, his fellow farm workers complained to their master that Isidore was always late for work in the morning. Upon investigation the master found Isidore at prayer while an angel was doing the ploughing for him.
 
On another occasion, his master saw an angel ploughing on either side of him, so that Isidore's work was equal to that of three of his fellow field workers. Isidore is also said to have brought back to life his master's deceased daughter, and to have caused a fountain of fresh water to burst from the dry earth to quench his master's thirst.

One snowy day, when going to the mill with wheat to be ground, he passed a flock of wood-pigeons scratching vainly for food on the hard surface of the frosty ground. Taking pity on the poor animals, he poured half of his sack of precious wheat upon the ground for the birds, despite the mocking of witnesses. When he reached the mill, however, the bag was full, and the wheat, when it was ground, produced double the expected amount of flour.

Isidore's wife, Maria, always kept a pot of stew on the fireplace in their humble home as Isidore would often bring home anyone who was hungry. One day he brought home more hungry people than usual. After she served many of them, Maria told him that there simply was no more stew in the pot. He insisted that she check the pot again, and she was able to spoon out enough stew to feed them all.

On 2 April 1212, after torrential rains had exhumed cadavers from cemeteries in Madrid, his body was discovered in an apparent state of incorruptibility.

He is said to have appeared to Alfonso VIII of Castile, and to have shown him the hidden path by which he surprised the Moors and gained the victory of Las Navas de Tolosa, in 1212. When King Philip III of Spain was cured of a deadly disease after touching the relics of the saint, the king replaced the old reliquary with a costly silver one and instigated the process of his beatification. Throughout history, other members of the royal family would seek curative powers from the saint.

The number of miracles attributed to him has been counted as 438. The only original source of hagiography on him is a fourteenth century codex called Códice de Juan Diácono which relates five of his miracles: 
The pigeons and the grain. 
The angels ploughing. 
The saving of his donkey, through prayer, from a wolf attack.
The account of his wife's pot of food. 
A similar account of his feeding the brotherhood. 
The codex also attests to the incorruptible state of his body, stating it was exhumed 40 years after his death.

Veneration

Isidore was beatified in Rome on 2 May 1619 by Pope Paul V. He was canonized nearly three years later by Pope Gregory XV, along with Saints Ignatius of Loyola, Francis Xavier, Teresa of Ávila and Philip Neri, on 12 March 1622.

In 1696, his relics were moved to the Royal Alcazar of Madrid to intervene on behalf of the health of Charles II of Spain. While there, the King's locksmith pulled a tooth from the body and gave it to the monarch, who slept with it under his pillow until his death. This was not the first, nor the last time his body was allegedly mutilated out of religious fervour. For example, it was reported one of the ladies in the court of Isabella I of Castile bit off one of his toes.

In 1760, his body was brought to the Royal Palace of Madrid during the illness of Maria Amalia of Saxony.

In 1769, Charles III of Spain had the remains of Saint Isidore and his wife Maria relocated to the San Isidro Church, Madrid. The sepulcher has nine locks and only the King of Spain has the master key. The opening of the sepulcher must be performed by the Archbishop of Madrid and authorized by the King himself. Consequently, it has not been opened since 1985.

His feast day is celebrated on 15 May in the Catholic Church, and in the Philippine Independent Church.

Patronage
Saint Isidore is widely venerated as the patron saint of farmers, peasants, day laborers and agriculture in general, as well as brick layers. His hometown of Madrid, the Spanish cities of Leon, Zaragoza, and Seville, and various locales in the former Spanish Empire honour him as their patron saint. The US National Catholic Rural Life Conference claims him as its patron. San Ysidro, California, and San Ysidro, New Mexico, were named after him.

Iconography
Saint Isidore is often portrayed as a peasant holding a sickle and a sheaf of corn. He might also be shown with a sickle and staff; as an angel plows for him; or with an angel and white oxen near him. In Spanish art, his emblems are a spade or a plough.

Legacy

The story of St. Isidore is a reminder of the dignity of work, and that ordinary life can lead to holiness. Legends about angel helpers and mysterious oxen indicate that his work was not neglected and his duties did not go unfulfilled. St. Isidore's life demonstrates that: If you have your spiritual self in order, your earthly commitments will fall into order also."

The house of his master, Juan de Vargas, in Madrid is now a museum, popularly known as the "Casa de San Isidro". It houses temporary exhibitions on the history of Madrid, as well as on the life of the saint. It is not to be confused with the aforementioned San Isidro Church. Not only does this museum contain a chapel built upon the place where Isidore lived and died, but also the well where his son fell and was saved.

Feast day celebrations and festivals
The date of his liturgical feast, which, though not included in the General Roman Calendar, has been celebrated for centuries in several countries and dioceses, is 15 May. Many towns venerate Saint Isidore and his wife Blessed María Torribia with processions in which the fields are blessed.

Spain

see also: Real Cortijo de San Isidro

One of the most celebrated holidays of Madrid is held on 15 May, the liturgical feast of Isidore who is the city's patron saint as well as of farmers. The traditional festival is held in an open-air area known as the Pradera del Santo. In the afternoon, the images of San Isidro and his wife, Santa María de la Cabeza, are paraded through the streets, from Calle del Sacramento to the Plaza de la Villa, passing through Calle del Cordón.

The feast in honor of San Isidro is declared of National Tourist Interest in Andalusia and is one of the most important celebrations in province of Malaga. The fiesta is very popular in Alameda because San Isidro is a co-patron of the town.

Celebrations honoring both saints are also held elsewhere in Spain. For years, the Alicantine locality of Castalla has been celebrating the Fair of San Isidro, where numerous companies display their products in a playful and festive atmosphere. A medieval swap meet and mechanical attractions are especially popular.

A large celebration is held in Estepona, near Marbella along the Costa del Sol in Andalucia, where locals celebrate the day by drinking a mix of brandy and a popular energy drink which is named in his honour. This has led to Saint Isidore often being termed the “patron saint of krunk” (the name of this combination drink in the United States).

The Romería festival in Almogia, a pueblo blanco in the campo halfway between Malaga to the south and Antequera, celebrates San Isidro, its patron saint, on the weekend in the middle of May with a fiesta carnival. Floats from the surrounding farming communities, accompanied by traditionally dressed ladies in flamenco dresses and caballeros on dancing horses, sing and dance from Almogia to the Romería ground a few kilometres north of the village and the festival includes music, traditional horse races, a bar for horses as well as their riders, and much parading of costume and finery. The best-dressed float is awarded a prize.

Chile

15 May is San Isidro Day in Cuz-Cuz, about five kilometers from the city of Illapel, Choapa province, in the Coquimbo region of Chile. If the day falls on a Monday, the following Sunday is celebrated. Celebrations begin at noon with a Mass, followed by a procession and Chilean dances.

Nicaragua
San Isidro, Matagalpa: The town celebrates it patron saint from 1 to 15 May.

Peru

The residents of San Isidro de Carampá of Ayacucho in the city of Lima celebrate a San Isidro festival. The First Society of San Isidro de Carampá organizes the festival, along with the Butler and the Adornante festivals. In the evening, after the celebration of the Mass, a procession moves to the house of the Adornante. On the next day, Central Day, another Mass is said, this time celebrated by the Butler. Another procession is held, followed by a festival.

Philippines
Many festivals are held in honour of Saint Isidore on or around 15 May in the Philippines, which is mostly agricultural and predominantly Catholic.

 The Apit Festival of Allacapan, Cagayan, done in praise and thanksgiving for the harvest gathered throughout the year. The Apit Festival is celebrated on 10–15 May.
 The Sabugan ng Biyaya Festival (often shortened to Sabugan Festival) of Agdangan, Quezon, is a thanksgiving event for the blessings that the town has received.
 The Pahiyás Festival is held in honour of Saint Isidore and Blessed María in Lucban, Quezon, in thanksgiving for a bountiful harvest. It is noted as local houses are decorated with produce and other agricultural products, which are given away after.
 The Kangga Festival is held on his feast day in Mogpog, Marinduque (the island also known for its Moriones Festival every Holy Week). The festivities highlight farming traditions, and give thanks for a good harvest and the town's continuing prosperity.
 The Bariw Festival in Nabas, Aklan, held every 12–15 May as Saint Isidore is the town's patron. The feast also showcases the town's bariw products such as hats and mats as well as unique local attractions.
 In Pulilan, Bulacan, carabaos are often dressed in clothes or painted, and trained to kneel on their forelegs before the Church of San Isidro Labrador during the fiesta. The custom, unique to the town, is performed as an act of veneration to the saint.
 Saint Isidore is celebrated in the towns of San Isidro and Talavera, Nueva Ecija. The province is often referred to as the "Rice Granary of the Philippines", as rice is its principal crop aside from maize and onion. Celebrations begin a week before the feast day itself, including daily novenas, Masses, processions, public entertainment and a funfair (perya).
 Barangay San Isidro in Lupao, Nueva Ecija also celebrates Saint Isidore as its patron saint.
 Roxas, Talugtug, Nueva Ecija in Talugtug, Nueva Ecija also celebrates the feast of Saint Isidore for 15 days until 15 May at the Church of Iglesia Filipina Independiente 
 Saint Isidore's feast is also celebrated in Lezo, Aklan every 14–15 May.
 Barangay Teguis in Poro, Cebu celebrates Saint Isidore's feast on 15 May, as well as the day after.
 The towns of Tubigon, San Isidro and Bilar in Bohol celebrates Saint Isidore's feast day on 15 May.
 Sitio Canipa-an in Barangay Banquerohan, Cadiz, Negros Occidental, also celebrates the feast annually in May. The first time the saint was honoured was in 1918. 
 In Pampanga, the Feast of San Isidro is celebrated every 15 May in different barangays. City of San Fernando, Bacolor, Macabebe, and other towns have barangays named after the saint.
In Hinunangan, Southern Leyte, Barangay Calag-itan, which has Saint Isidore the Farmer Chapel, and Barangay Catublian, which hosts the Parish of Saint Isidore the Farmer, as well as Silago also venerate Saint Isidore. These three belong to the Iglesia Filipina Independiente, a national church that split from the Catholic Church after the Philippine Revolution and recognises pre-schism saints.
In Barangay Salawag, Dasmariñas, the Feast of San Isidro is celebrated along with the Feast of the Arrival of the Virgin of Salawag. Saint Isidore is the principal patron of the village, and secondary patron of the local parish since 1987.
Saint Isidore is the Patron Saint of Barangay San Roque, and also entitled as the 2nd Patron Saint of the whole municipality of Naic. On May 15, the Feast day of Saint Isidore, the Parish together with the whole town celebrates the BIHISAKAHAN Festival wherein the native dishes and local products are decorated and served for everyone.
Saint Isidore's feast is also celebrated in some places in Northern Samar particularly in the municipality of Palapag where in mostly of its barangays honored Saint Isidore the farmer as their patron saint. These barangay includes Cabariwan, Nipa, Campedico, Matambag, Natawo, Nagbobtac, Napo, Bangon, Jangtud, Mabaras, Magsaysay, Manajao, and Sangay.
Saint Isidore the Farmer is the Patron Saint of Zamboanguita, Negros Oriental and celebrates its feast day on 15 May.
San Isidro Labrador Parish Las Pinas City of Diocese of Paranaque celebrate its feast day every year on 15 May.  
San Isidro Labrador is the Second Patron of the Diocesan Shrine of the FIVE WOUNDS of Our Lord Jesus Christ Parish. Under this Parish a chapel of San Isidro Labrador, in Carmencita Admiral, known to be the first chapel in Las Pinas established under the Archdiocese of Manila dedicated to San Isidro. Together the Shrine and the chapel celebrated the saint feast day every 15 May.

United States
In 1947, at the request of the National Catholic Rural Life Conference, he was officially named patron of farmers, with a feast day on 10 May in all dioceses of the United States, with a proper Mass and Office. When St Isidore's feast was first inserted into the calendar for the United States in the year 1947, the feast day of Saint John Baptist de La Salle was still being celebrated on 15 May, with the result that the celebration of his feast was assigned to 22 March.

With the 1969 revision of the General Roman Calendar, the memorial of Saint John Baptist de la Salle was moved to his day of death, 7 April, and Saint Isidore's was restored to the 15 May date and is celebrated as an optional memorial. In some places within the US and Canada, his feast is celebrated on 25 October, and other locations and some Traditionalist Catholics in that area, though not elsewhere, keep the 22 March date.

Corrales, New Mexico
In Corrales, New Mexico, the town celebrates the San Ysidro Feast day on 15 May. Matachines dance through the streets and the fiesta is a big part of the celebrations in the city.

See also
 Saint Isidore the Laborer, patron saint archive

References

External links
 St Isidore the Farmer
 Visitors guide to the Fiestas San Isidro in Madrid
 Yucatan, Mexico celebrates San Isidro Labrador in multiple town fiestas
 Lucban San Isidro Pahiyas Festival website
 The Life of San Isidro, Labrador
 Saint Isidore the Laborer at the Christian Iconography web site

1070s births
1130 deaths
12th-century people from León and Castile
12th-century Christian saints
Burials in Madrid
Canonizations by Pope Gregory XV
Spanish farmers
Incorrupt saints
Medieval Spanish saints
Spanish Roman Catholic saints
Animals in Christianity
Mozarabs
Christians from al-Andalus
11th-century people from al-Andalus
People from Madrid